Protein BEX2 also known as brain-expressed X-linked protein 2 is a protein that in humans is encoded by the BEX2 gene.

References

Further reading